Dul Rural District is in the Central District of Urmia County, West Azerbaijan province, Iran. At the National Census of 2006, its population was 8,524 in 1,974 households. There were 7,530 inhabitants in 2,076 households at the following census of 2011. At the most recent census of 2016, the population of the rural district was 7,487 in 2,130 households. The largest of its 27 villages was Dizaj-e Dowl, with 768 people.

References 

Urmia County

Rural Districts of West Azerbaijan Province

Populated places in West Azerbaijan Province

Populated places in Urmia County